{{DISPLAYTITLE:D8 polytope}}

In 8-dimensional geometry, there are 191 uniform polytopes with D8 symmetry, 64 are unique, and 127 are shared with the B8 symmetry. There are two regular forms, the 8-orthoplex, and 8-demicube with 16 and 128 vertices respectively.

They can be visualized as symmetric orthographic projections in Coxeter planes of the D8 Coxeter group, and other subgroups.


Graphs 

Symmetric orthographic projections of these 64 polytopes can be made in the D8, D7, D6, D5, D4, D3, A5, A3, Coxeter planes. Ak has [k+1] symmetry, Dk has [2(k-1)] symmetry. B8 is also included although only half of its [16] symmetry exists in these polytopes.

These 64 polytopes are each shown in these 10 symmetry planes, with vertices and edges drawn, and vertices colored by the number of overlapping vertices in each projective position.

References

8-polytopes